"Notion" is a song by American indie rock band the Rare Occasions, written by lead singer Brian McLaughlin. It was first released independently as part of their Futureproof EP on August 5, 2016. The song went viral on TikTok in October 2021. The renewed popularity of the song led the band to re-release it as a single.

Meaning
"Notion" is about religion, or specifically, not believing in it. The opening lines ("Sure it's a calming notion, perpetual in motion, but I don't need the comfort in any lies") describe how religious texts calm people, though what it tells might not be true. In his 2016 review of the EP Futureproof, Mitch Mosk of Atwood Magazine wrote that the song makes one consider that "Life has its ups and its downs, but that isn't a reason to not live each day to our fullest potential."

Reception
"Notion" entered the UK Singles Chart for two weeks and peaked at number 72.

Personnel

The Rare Occasions
 Brian McLaughlin – lead and backing vocals, rhythm guitar, orchestral arrangement
 Peter Stone – lead guitar
 Jeremy Cohen – bass guitar
 Luke Imbusch – drums, percussion

Technical 
 Maria Rice – mastering
 Steve Sacco – production, mixing, recording
 Mitchell Haeuszer – recording

Charts

Weekly charts

Year-end charts

Certifications

References

External links
 Notion official music video on YouTube

2016 songs
2021 singles
Indie rock songs